Adesar is a small village in Kutch district, Gujarat, India.

History
The town was protected by fort which were damaged in 1816 following war with Rao Bharmalji of Cutch State.

The town had ancient Suryanarayan temple destroyed in 2001 Bhuj earthquake. It was rebuilt again later.

References

Cities and towns in Kutch district